Antiphrasis is the rhetorical device of saying the opposite of what is actually meant in such a way that it is obvious what the true intention is.

Some authors treat and use antiphrasis just as irony, euphemism or litotes.

Etymology 
Antiphrasis is a Greek word which means 'opposite words'.

Antiphrasis as euphemism

Some euphemisms are antiphrasis, such as "Eumenides" 'the gracious ones' to mean the Erinyes, deities of vengeance.

Examples

 "Take your time, we've got all day", meaning "hurry up, we don't have all day".
 "Come into my parlour, said the spider to the fly" appears to be an invitation, but is in fact a threat.
 "Tell me about it", in the sense of "don't bother, I already know".
 "Great!", an exclamation uttered when something unpleasant had happened or is about to happen.

See also

 Irony
 Litotes
 Satire
 Sarcasm

Notes

Rhetorical techniques
Figures of speech